Nathan Greno (born March 22, 1975) is an American film director, story artist, and writer best known as the co-director of the 2010 animated film Tangled.

Inspired by Disney films since the first grade, Greno started as a young boy writing and drawing comic books and strips. In 1996, during his junior year at Columbus College of Art and Design, he was hired by Walt Disney Feature Animation. He started there as an animation cleaner on Mulan (1998). Being creatively unfulfilled, he switched to story development. He then contributed as a story artist on Brother Bear (2003), wrote a screenplay and worked as a story artist on Meet the Robinsons (2007), and supervised the story on Bolt (2008). With the short film Super Rhino (2009), he made his directorial debut. In 2006, he took over a long-in-development project Tangled, based on the fairy tale Rapunzel and chose Byron Howard, with whom he had collaborated on Bolt and Super Rhino, as a directing partner. The film was released in 2010 to a great critical and financial reception, and was followed in 2012 by Greno and Howard-directed short film Tangled Ever After.

Greno had most recently been directing an animated film titled Gigantic. Loosely based on the fairy tale of Jack and the Beanstalk, it was scheduled for a 2020 release. However, in October 2017, it was announced that the film had been shelved. In February 2018, it was announced that Greno had signed a multiyear contract with Skydance Media to write and direct an animated film provisionally titled Powerless, as well as consult on projects in development.

Filmography

Films

Shorts

TV specials

Cancelled feature film projects

References

External links
 

American animated film directors
Animation screenwriters
Animators from Wisconsin
Living people
Walt Disney Animation Studios people
People from Kenosha, Wisconsin
Film directors from Wisconsin
1975 births
Skydance Media people